James Curtis may refer to:
 James Curtis (author) (1907–1977), British author
 James Curtis (biographer), American biographer
 James Curtis (journalist) (fl. 1828–1835), British eccentric and journalist
 James Curtis (politician) (died 1819), merchant and political figure in Prince Edward Island
 James C. Curtis (1797–1881), New York politician
 James F. Curtis (1825–1914), vigilante leader in San Francisco and its first Chief of Police
 James L. Curtis (1870–1917), American ambassador
 James O. Curtis (1804–1890), shipbuilder from Medford Massachusetts
 James Waltham Curtis (1839–1901), English-born artist in Australia
 Diego Cortez (born James Curtis, 1946–2021), American filmmaker and art curator
 Kasey James (born 1982), also known as James Curtis, American wrestler

See also
James Curtis Hepburn (1815–1911), Christian missionary known for the transliteration of the Japanese language into the Latin alphabet
James Curtiss (1806–1859), former mayor of Chicago
Jim Curtiss (1861–1945), 19th-century baseball player